= Whirly =

Transcription factor

Identifiers
- Symbol: Whirly
- Pfam: PF08536
- InterPro: IPR013742
Available protein structures:
- PDB: IPR013742 PF08536 (ECOD; PDBsum)
- AlphaFold: IPR013742; PF08536

In molecular biology, the protein domain Whirly is a transcription factor commonly found in plants. This means they aid the transcription of genes from DNA into a complementary copy of mRNA. In particular, in plants, they aid the transcription of plant defence genes.

== Function ==
The function of Whirly proteins is to regulate the expression of genes that aid defence. They are transcription factors which bind to single stranded DNA in order to regulate gene expression. When a pathogen enters, salicylic acid is released as a signalling molecule which affects Whirly, allowing the expression of defence genes to occur.

== Structure ==
This protein contains 10 beta strands and 2 alpha helices.

== History ==
PBF-2 was the first protein in the Whirly family to be discovered. In the past, the protein has also been named p24.
